Budha Debbarma was a politician and indigenous leader from Tripura. He became Member of Tripura Legislative Assembly in 1983
   and 1988 from Golaghati Legislative Assembly. He was one of the leader who help to built Tripura Upajati Juba Samiti.

References 

Tripura MLAs 1983–1988
Tripuri people
Tripura MLAs 1988–1993